A windstorm is a storm, which is a severe weather condition. 

Windstorm may also refer to:
 European windstorm, a type of storm in Europe
 Windstorm (album), a 1978 album by Gloria Jones
 Windstorm (film), a 2013 German adventure film